Eddard "Ned" Stark is a fictional character in the 1996 fantasy novel A Game of Thrones by George R. R. Martin, and Game of Thrones, HBO's adaptation of Martin's A Song of Ice and Fire series. In the storyline, Ned is the lord of Winterfell, an ancient fortress in the North of the fictional continent of Westeros. Though the character is established as the main character in the novel and the first season of the TV adaptation, a plot twist involving Ned at the end of the novel and the end of the first season shocked both readers of the book and viewers of the TV series.

Ned is portrayed by Sean Bean in the first season of Game of Thrones, as a child by Sebastian Croft in the sixth season and as a young adult by Robert Aramayo in the sixth and seventh seasons. Bean was nominated for a Saturn Award for Best Actor on Television and a Scream Award for Best Fantasy Actor for the role. He and the rest of the cast were nominated for Screen Actors Guild Awards for Outstanding Performance by an Ensemble in a Drama Series in 2011.

Character

Description 
In A Game of Thrones (1996), Ned Stark is introduced as the virtuous and honorable patriarch of House Stark and the father of six children. The moral compass of the story, he is content to remain far from courtly intrigues and is unwavering in his view of loyalty and honor. His family name, Stark, serves as an indication of his resistance to moral compromise, but his boundaries are increasingly tested over the course of the novel. Finding himself a key player in the escalating political intrigue of King's Landing, Ned struggles as his own sense of honor draws him into corrupt goings-on at court. As the story progresses, he begins to see the importance of moral and practical compromises to achieve a just end, and is ultimately forced to choose between the safety of his family and doing what is right.

Sean Bean said of the character, "He's a good man trying to do his best in the middle of this corruption, he's a fish out of water, he's used to being up north in Winterfell where people are pretty straight and pragmatic, and he comes down to a place where people are playing games and backstabbing ... he's a principled man who tries to hold things together. This is a journey that he makes where ultimately his loyalty causes his downfall."

Development and overview 
Publishers Weekly noted in 1996 that, despite the honest Ned Stark's intervention in court politics, "no amount of heroism or good intentions can keep the realm under control." From his very first introduction, Ned is portrayed as a noble hero and set up to be the heart of the story. With fifteen chapters devoted to his point of view, more than any single character in the novel, he is presented as a primary character in the series, and the main storyline of A Game of Thrones, the drama in King's Landing, is told entirely from his perspective. In the London Review of Books, John Lanchester writes that everything about Ned is designed to gain audience sympathy, from his strong sense of honor and moral compass to his compassion towards his wife and children. Readers are led to believe that Ned will be the main character of the series, but ultimately he is, from a literary perspective, a classic decoy protagonist. After struggling to keep himself and the kingdom on a moral path for the entire novel, the only option that remains to save his family is to put aside his honor; he does so, but is betrayed anyway. Calling Ned's execution "shocking", The New York Times noted in 2011 that the novel was "famous for dispatching a thoroughly admirable major character with whom readers have been identifying for most of the book". In an interview for Entertainment Weekly, author George R. R. Martin commented on this misdirection:

David Benioff, executive producer and writer of the HBO adaptation, told Entertainment Weekly that when he read the novel:

In a review of the Game of Thrones TV episode "Baelor", James Poniewozik wrote in Time that "the execution of Eddard Stark is crucial to the story and its themes and everything that follows, but it's also a meta-message to the reader: don't take anything for granted here". James Hibberd of Entertainment Weekly stated that tricking the audience into thinking Ned is the hero and then killing him makes the series' story better. Writing that "the big twist here isn't that Ned Stark dies, but who the true protagonists of Game of Thrones are", Hibberd pointed out that the series' focus proves to be the "new generation" of leaders, in particular the Stark children but also Daenerys and even Tyrion. He noted:

Storylines

Background 
As established in A Game of Thrones, Eddard "Ned" Stark is the second son of Rickard Stark, the Lord of Winterfell. Years before the events of the novel, the quiet and shy young Ned is fostered in the Vale by Jon Arryn. During this time Ned becomes close friends with Robert Baratheon, heir to the Stormlands and another ward of Arryn's. Robert is eventually betrothed to Ned's sister Lyanna, but before he can marry her, Crown Prince Rhaegar Targaryen absconds with Lyanna. Ned's father and older brother Brandon go to King Aerys II Targaryen and demand that Lyanna be freed; the so-called "Mad King" executes both Rickard and Brandon, convinced that the Starks seek to usurp him. Ned, Robert, and Arryn then rise in revolt, securing the support of House Tully with Ned marrying Brandon's betrothed Catelyn Tully. Ned leaves for war the very next morning.

At the decisive Battle of the Trident, Robert manages to kill Prince Rhaegar and scatter the Targaryen army. Robert is injured in the battle, so Ned takes command and marches on the capital. In King's Landing, Ned finds that House Lannister has — through treachery — already sacked the city, and murdered Aerys and the royal family. Disgusted by the dishonorable massacre, Ned departs to lift the siege of the Baratheon stronghold Storm's End, and later attempts to rescue Lyanna but finds her dying; her last words are "Promise me Ned." Ned returns to Winterfell with his bastard son Jon Snow in tow; meanwhile Catelyn has delivered their son and Ned's heir, Robb, conceived on their wedding night.

Six years after the end of Robert's Rebellion, Balon Greyjoy, the Lord of the Iron Islands, declares independence from the Iron Throne. Ned aids King Robert in putting down "Greyjoy's Rebellion". Balon surrenders, and his sole surviving heir, Theon, is taken back to Winterfell as Stark's ward and hostage. Ned rules the North for nine more years before the events of the novel.

A Game of Thrones 
As A Game of Thrones begins, Catelyn informs Ned that his mentor Jon Arryn had died, and that King Robert intends to offer Ned Jon's old position as Hand of the King. Content to be far from court intrigue, Ned is reluctant to accept the offer until he receives a letter from Arryn's widow, who believes that her husband had been poisoned by the Lannisters. Ned subsequently agrees to the appointment to protect Robert. He then travels south to King's Landing with his daughters Sansa and Arya. Catelyn later comes to the capital in secret, under the protection of her childhood friend Petyr "Littlefinger" Baelish, to tell Ned of an assassination attempt on their young son Bran. Ned's longstanding mistrust of the Lannisters is further fueled by Littlefinger's confirmation that the dagger used by the would-be assassin once belonged to Tyrion Lannister. Increasingly disgusted by the political intrigues at court, Ned finally resigns his position when Robert insists on having Aerys' only surviving child, the young Daenerys Targaryen, assassinated in exile. Meanwhile, Catelyn has taken Tyrion hostage at the Eyrie, and in retaliation Jaime Lannister attacks and seriously injures Ned in the street before he and his daughters can depart King's Landing. Visiting a wounded Ned, Robert reappoints him as Hand.

Ned eventually concludes that all of Robert's heirs with his wife Cersei are illegitimate, the product of her incest with her twin brother Jaime. Further, Ned suspects that Arryn had been poisoned to conceal the truth. Ned confronts Cersei with his discovery and gives her the chance to escape with her children into exile. Before Ned can tell the king, Robert is fatally wounded while hunting and names Ned Protector of the Realm, to function as regent until his "son" Joffrey comes of age. Ned alters Robert's will, replacing Joffrey's name with "my rightful heir" to make the succession ambiguous. With the palace in chaos, Ned rebuffs multiple offers to increase his own power, instead opting to crown Robert's brother, Stannis Baratheon, as king. Cersei, however, outmaneuvers Ned, and the duplicitous Littlefinger has the city watch arrest Ned instead of Cersei. With all of his entourage slaughtered, Sansa a hostage and Arya escaped but alone, Ned is charged with treason. A deal is struck in which Ned will be spared and sent into exile if he declares Joffrey the rightful king. Fearing for his daughters, Ned makes a public confession of his "treason". The sadistic Joffrey, however, has Ned executed anyway for his own amusement.

Later novels 
Ned's arrest pits the Stark and Lannister forces against each other, and his execution causes a civil war later called the War of the Five Kings. Tyrion Lannister eventually returns Ned's bones to his widow Catelyn, but it is not confirmed whether they ever arrived at Winterfell. He is mentioned in a flashback along with his friend Robert Baratheon in the follow-up novel A Clash of Kings.

Family tree of House Stark

TV adaptation 

In January 2007 HBO secured the rights to adapt Martin's series for television. When the pilot went into production in 2009, one of the first casting announcements was Sean Bean as the "lead" Eddard Stark. As the show premiered in 2011, the Los Angeles Times called Bean's Ned "the strong and brooding headliner of the series".

As in the source novel, Ned is beheaded in the ninth episode of season 1, "Baelor". Though praising the character's demise for its role in propelling the story, James Hibberd of Entertainment Weekly later noted that:

Hibberd echoed the show's producers' statement that "the move lays down a dramatic precedent for the show: Nobody is safe". He called it a "risky" move that would probably lose the show viewers who had tuned in for Bean, but would hopefully attract others impressed by the boldness of it. Executive producer and writer D. B. Weiss told Entertainment Weekly in 2011 that when he and Benioff pitched the series to HBO, the fact that "main character" Ned was slated to die "was a selling point for them". Noting that the network has killed off characters in other successful series, he said that this sense of jeopardy "completely ups the ante for any moment when a character is in a dire situation if you know another character didn't survive a similar situation". HBO programming president Sue Naegle concurred, saying that Ned's death made the show creatively more attractive, adding that "The book series was filled with unexpected twists and turns. I loved this idea we'd bring together the group of characters, then once you started to believe all the tropes of heroes, you pull the rug out from under them. It's the opposite of feeling manipulated". Noting that the story and world of the series is bigger than any one character, Naegle said, "Sean brings a giant following, but Thrones is not just about the promise you're going to see one of your favorite actors week in and week out. The star is the story". Bean noted that Ned's death "was as much a surprise to me as anyone" and called it "a very courageous move for a television company".

The image of Bean as Ned Stark sitting in the Iron Throne is featured on the covers of the 2011 Season 1 DVD and Blu-ray Disc sets, released in March 2012.

The character makes a return in the sixth season, under a recurring capacity, via flashback visions of his youth and childhood seen by Bran and the Three-Eyed Raven using Greensight.

Storylines

Season 1
In season 1, King Robert Baratheon travels to Winterfell and asks his old friend and closest ally Eddard "Ned" Stark, Lord of Winterfell and Warden of the North, to assume the position of Hand of the King after the sudden death of their mentor, Jon Arryn. Not interested in politics or the intrigues of the court, Ned accepts out of duty, as well as to discover how Arryn died. Ned travels to King's Landing with his daughters Arya and Sansa, the latter of which is betrothed to Robert's eldest son, Prince Joffrey. Meanwhile, Ned's wife Catelyn has Tyrion Lannister captured, believing he was responsible for sending an assassin to kill Bran and that the Lannisters also killed Jon Arryn. Ned and Robert soon find themselves at odds regarding Daenerys Targaryen, and Ned steps down as Hand in defiance against Robert's wishes to have her killed. Soon after, Ned and his guards are attacked by Tyrion's brother Jaime Lannister; Ned is injured and his men are murdered. Robert reappoints Ned as Hand and commands him to have Catelyn release Tyrion and make peace with the Lannisters. While Robert departs for a boar hunt, Ned discovers that Tywin Lannister and his forces are laying siege to the Riverlands, the homeland of his wife's house, the Tullys. He demands Tywin present himself in King's Landing and sends a force to bring his bannermen to justice.     

Robert is killed just as Ned discovers that his three children by Cersei were actually fathered by the queen's twin, Jaime. Before Ned is able to neutralize Cersei and place Robert's brother Stannis on the throne, he is betrayed by Littlefinger, and the queen has him imprisoned for treason. Ned's eldest son Robb calls in his father's banners and marches an army south in an attempt to rescue his father. Ned makes a public confession to save his daughters from Cersei's wrath, but Joffrey has Ned beheaded anyway.

Seasons 6 and 7
In the season 6 episode "Home", Bran sees a vision of Ned (Sebastian Croft) as a child with his sister and brother, Lyanna and Benjen. In the following episode, "Oathbreaker", Bran witnesses the battle between a young Ned (Robert Aramayo) and the knight Ser Arthur Dayne at the Tower of Joy. In the episode "The Door", Bran watches Ned bid Benjen and his father, Rickard, farewell as he departs for his fosterage at the Vale. In the following episode, "Blood of My Blood", Bran briefly glimpses Ned's hand amongst someone's blood, revealed in the season finale, "The Winds of Winter", as belonging to Lyanna (Aisling Franciosi), dying of childbirth in the tower. She makes him swear to protect her son - Jon Snow. Bran revisits this moment in the season 7 finale, "The Dragon and the Wolf", where Lyanna whispers Jon's true name to Ned - Aegon Targaryen.

Recognition and awards
Bean was nominated for a Saturn Award for Best Actor on Television, a Scream Award for Best Fantasy Actor, and an EWwy Award for Best Actor, Drama for the role. IGN named Ned its Best TV Hero of 2011, and Bean won the Portal Award for Best Actor.

References 

A Song of Ice and Fire characters
Fictional advisors
Literary characters introduced in 1996
Fictional lords and ladies
Fictional people executed by decapitation
Fictional regents
Fictional revolutionaries
Fictional swordfighters
Fictional war veterans
Male characters in literature
Male characters in television
Television characters introduced in 2011